Barrancas Blancas is a peak in Chile with an elevation of  metres. Barrancas Blancas is within the following mountain ranges: Chilean Andes and Puna de Atacama. It is located within the territory of the Chilean province of Copiapo. Its slopes are within the administrative boundaries of the Chilean commune of Copiapo.

First Ascent 
Barrancas Blancas was first climbed by Gaston Muga, Julián Bilbao and Arnaldo González (Chile) 15 February 1969.

Elevation 
Other data from available digital elevation models: SRTM yields 6095 metres, ASTER 6077 metres and TanDEM-X 6146 metres. The height of the nearest key col is 5060 meters, leading to a topographic prominence of 1059 meters. Barrancas Blancas is considered a Mountain Massif according to the Dominance System  and its dominance is 17.31%. Its parent peak is Ojos del Salado and the Topographic isolation is 18.1 kilometers.

External links 

 Elevation information about Barrancas Blancas
 Weather Forecast at Barrancas Blancas

See also
List of mountains in the Andes

References

Mountains of Chile
Six-thousanders of the Andes